Eun Jung Kim is a South Korean computer scientist and graph theorist specializing in parameterized complexity, parameterized algorithms for constraint satisfaction problems, and width parameters in graphs and matroids. She is a researcher for the French National Centre for Scientific Research (CNRS), associated with Paris Dauphine University.

Education and career
Kim studied industrial engineering at KAIST in Korea, obtaining a master's degree, and then completed her Ph.D. in computer science in 2010 at Royal Holloway, University of London. Her dissertation was supervised by Gregory Gutin.

Recognition
In 2017, Kim was awarded the CNRS Bronze Medal.

References

External links
Home page

Year of birth missing (living people)
Living people
South Korean computer scientists
South Korean women computer scientists
21st-century South Korean mathematicians
South Korean women mathematicians
Theoretical computer scientists
Graph theorists
KAIST alumni
Alumni of Royal Holloway, University of London
French National Centre for Scientific Research scientists